Bhokraha  is former a village development committee in Sunsari District in the Kosi Zone of south-eastern Nepal.Currently, it merged with Narsinghtappu to become a gaunpalika. At the time of the 1991 Nepal census it had a population of 12,683 people living in 2146 individual households.

References

Populated places in Sunsari District